James Newman may refer to:
 James Newman (actor) (born 1992), American actor
 James Newman (singer), English singer-songwriter
 James C. Newman, American engineer and materials scientist
 James H. Newman (born 1956), American astronaut
 James R. Newman (1907–1966), mathematician and mathematical historian
 James W. Newman (1841–1901), Democratic politician in Ohio
 James Newman (Canadian politician) (1903–1963), Liberal-Labour politician in Ontario, Canada
 James Newman (geriatrician) (1903–1983), New Zealand geriatrician and medical superintendent
 James Newman (mining engineer) (1880–1973), Australian mining engineer and grazier
 James Newman-Newman (1767–1811), British naval officer
 Jim Newman (television producer) (born 1933), film and television producer
 Jim Newman (actor), actor and writer
 Jim Newman, member of the Village People
 Jimmy C. Newman (1927–2014), American country music and cajun singer-songwriter